AMC Dental College is a dental college in Khokhra (Maninagar east), Ahmedabad, India. It is affiliated to Gujarat University and approved by the Dental Council of India. It opened in 2010.

History
AMC Dental College was established in 2009 by AMC Medical Education Trust and was inaugurated in April 2010 by Gujarat Chief Minister Narendra Modi in Khokhra, which falls under his assembly constituency, Maninagar.

References

External links
Official website

Dental colleges in India
Universities and colleges in Ahmedabad
Gujarat University
Educational institutions established in 2010
2010 establishments in Gujarat